Jermaine Ale (born 22 May 1985) is an Australian former rugby league footballer who played for the Canberra Raiders club in the National Rugby League competition. His position of choice was on the wing.

Background
Ale was born in Newcastle, New South Wales, Australia.

While attending Lambton High School, Ale played for the Australian Schoolboys team in 2002.

Career playing statistics

Point scoring summary

Matches played

References

External links
 Official Jermaine Ale NRL profile (Dead link)

1985 births
Living people
Australian rugby league players
Canberra Raiders players
Rugby league players from Newcastle, New South Wales
Rugby league wingers
Western Suburbs Rosellas players